BAM (short for Bay Area Music) was a free bi-weekly music magazine founded and published by Dennis Erokan in the San Francisco Bay Area from January 1976 until June 1999.

History 
Bay Area Music magazine was first published in January 1976. It was a free bi-weekly magazine that was funded by advertisers.

In the mid-1980s the magazine reached its largest circulation of 130,000 biweekly throughout California, after opening an office in Los Angeles. After the opening of the Los Angeles office, separate Northern and Southern editions of BAM were published.

In October 1994, the magazine got a new publisher, Earl Adkins. Adkins resigned in spring 1995. In 1995, Bam magazine's parent company, Bam Media, bought the copyright to the Seattle Rocket.

The final edition of the print magazine was published in June 1999. The paper's circulation at the time of closing was 55,000. The BAM logo was used as the music section of This Week, another Bam Media publication, after the paper folded.

Relaunch 
In 2011, BAM returned as an online magazine at BAMmagazine.com, operated by Dennis Erokan.

Bammies
In 1977, Erokan founded the Bay Area Music Awards, better known as the Bammies, a yearly awards show for musicians in the San Francisco Bay Area. Winners were voted on by BAM's readers. In 1998, the Bammies name was changed to the California Music Awards. In March 2018, there was a Bammies Reunion Concert in San Francisco.

MicroTimes
MicroTimes was a free regional computer magazine, focused on industry personalities, founded and published by Dennis Erokan in the San Francisco Bay Area starting in 1984 and  sold in 1999.

References

Biweekly magazines published in the United States
Music magazines published in the United States
Online music magazines published in the United States
Defunct magazines published in the United States
Free magazines
Magazines established in 1976
Magazines disestablished in 1999
Magazines published in the San Francisco Bay Area
Online magazines with defunct print editions